Abderramán Brenes la Roche (born October 22, 1978) is a Puerto Rican judoka, who played for the half-middleweight category. Brenes represented Puerto Rico at the 2008 Summer Olympics in Beijing, where he competed for the men's half-middleweight class (81 kg). He received a bye for the second preliminary round, before losing out by two yuko and a morote gari (double leg takedown) to Italy's Giuseppe Maddaloni.

References

External links

NBC Olympics Profile

1978 births
People from Río Piedras, Puerto Rico
Puerto Rican male judoka
Living people
Olympic judoka of Puerto Rico
Judoka at the 2008 Summer Olympics